Claude is a city in and the county seat of Armstrong County, Texas, United States. The population was 1,196 at the 2010 census.  It is located east of Amarillo in the south Texas Panhandle. Claude is part of the Amarillo Metropolitan Statistical Area but is some thirty miles east of Amarillo.

History

During the first half of the 16th century, the Spanish conquistador Francisco Coronado and his party passed through Claude and Tule Canyon, a scenic wonder to the south of Claude off Texas State Highway 207.

Claude was originally named Armstrong City after several area ranches named Armstrong.

The town name became Claude in 1887, named for Claude Ayers.  He was the engineer of the first train of the Fort Worth and Denver Railway to travel through the area.

When Armstrong County was formed in 1890, Claude and Washburn competed to be the county seat. The tie-breaking vote for Claude was reportedly cast by the legendary cattleman Charles Goodnight, former co-owner of the nearby JA Ranch. The Armstrong County Courthouse in Claude dates to 1912.

W.A. Warner (1864–1934), a physician in Claude, organized Boy Scouts of America Troop 17 in the spring of 1912. Thirty boys met in his drugstore. As scoutmaster, Dr. Warner trained many of the future civic leaders of Claude. During his medical career, Warner delivered some two thousand babies. Mrs. Warner (1866–1935), the former Phebe Kerrick, became an active community leader in Claude. Both were Illinois natives but with heritage from southwest Haiti.

W.S. Decker established a weekly newspaper, The Claude Argus, which later merged with the Goodnight News to become The Claude News in 1890.

The Armstrong County Museum has local and western-themed exhibits. The film "Hud" starring Paul Newman and Patricia Neal was filmed there in 1962.

Geography

Climate
According to the Köppen Climate Classification system, Claude has a semi-arid climate, abbreviated "BSk" on climate maps.

Demographics

2020 census

As of the 2020 United States census, there were 1,186 people, 496 households, and 369 families residing in the city.

2000 census
As of the census of 2000, there were 1,313 people, 479 households, and 362 families residing in the city. The population density was 766.5 people per square mile (296.5/km2). There were 538 housing units at an average density of 314.1/sq mi (121.5/km2). The racial makeup of the city was 95.96% White, 0.23% African American, 0.46% Native American, 2.89% from other races, and 0.46% from two or more races. Hispanic or Latino of any race were 5.56% of the population.

There were 479 households, out of which 34.4% had children under the age of 18 living with them, 66.6% were married couples living together, 6.1% had a female householder with no husband present, and 24.4% were non-families. 22.5% of all households were made up of individuals, and 13.8% had someone living alone who was 65 years of age or older. The average household size was 2.58 and the average family size was 3.01.

In the city, the population was spread out, with 26.0% under the age of 18, 6.5% from 18 to 24, 24.2% from 25 to 44, 23.0% from 45 to 64, and 20.3% who were 65 years of age or older. The median age was 41 years. For every 100 females, there were 92.2 males. For every 100 females age 18 and over, there were 84.3 males.

The median income for a household in the city was $38,641, and the median income for a family was $43,750. Males had a median income of $33,542 versus $21,371 for females. The per capita income for the city was $16,299. About 8.8% of families and 12.5% of the population were below the poverty line, including 19.5% of those under age 18 and 17.5% of those age 65 or over.

Film history
Several movies have been filmed in and around Claude including Hud (1963) starring Paul Newman, Leap of Faith (1993) starring Steve Martin, and Sunshine Christmas (1977) starring Cliff DeYoung. Additionally, the closing sunset scene in Indiana Jones and the Last Crusade (1989) was shot in Claude.

Education
The Claude Independent School District serves Claude and home to the Claude High School Mustangs.

The first school in Claude was built in 1883. In 1907, a three-story building replaced the original building at a cost of $14,000. Unfortunately, years later a fire burned most of this building down. The portion of the building that was restored currently houses the Claude Junior High School.

During the 1930s, Claude had the only official-sized gymnasium in the area. The West Texas State College (now West Texas A&M University) basketball team used it on numerous occasions.

Notable people

 W. J. Adkins, founding president of Laredo Community College and high school principal in Claude in the 1930s
 Tom Blasingame (1898–1989), considered to have been the oldest cowboy in the American West, lived in Claude. He worked in ranching, mostly on the JA Ranch, for seventy-three years until his death in 1989
 Laura Vernon Hamner, an historian, was the postmistress in Claude from 1913 to 1921. In 1935, she penned a novel about Charles Goodnight entitled The No-Gun Man from Texas. In 1943, she published the acclaimed Short Grass and Longhorns
 Charles E. Maple, a journalist, chamber of commerce official, and Texas state parks figure, graduated in 1950 from Claude High School
 Tom Mechler, Texas state Republican chairman since 2015; oil and gas consultant in Amarillo, formerly lived in Claude
 Charles Howard Roan, Medal of Honor Recipient, Battle of Peleliu – 1944 – United States Marine Corps

References

. Accessed 31 May 2005.

External links

Armstrong County
The Claude News, newspaper
Claude School District
Armstrong County Museum

Cities in Armstrong County, Texas
Cities in Texas
County seats in Texas
Cities in Amarillo metropolitan area